{{Infobox film
| name           = Hareendran Oru Nishkalankan
| image          = Hareendran Oru Nishkalankan.jpg
| alt            = 
| caption        = 
| director       = Vinayan
| producer       = Satish Nair
| writer         = Vishnu Vinay(story)
Vinayan (screenplay)
| starring       = Indrajith Jayasurya Sherin Bhama  Manikuttan
| music          = *songsBerny-Ignatious
Background scoreBijipal
| cinematography = Venugopalan
| editing        = G. Murali  
| studio         = 
| distributor    = 
| released       = 16 November 2007
| runtime        = 
| country        = India
| language       = Malayalam
| budget         = 
| gross          = 
}}Hareendran Oru Nishkalankan''' is a 2007 Indian Malayalam-language film directed by Vinayan and written by Vishnu Vinayan, based on his own comic book. The movie stars Indrajith and Jayasurya in the lead roles.http://specials.rediff.com/movies/2007/nov/16sld1.htm

Plot
The movie is narrated by Hareendra Varma, who is a rich young businessman. He is acquitted by the court in a sensational murder case. He begins narrating the story on the morning of the date of his death sentence.

GK, or Gopalakrishnan, is Hareendran's close friend who thinks that money is the only important thing in life. He used to work sincerely for Hareendran's company, Starline Software Incorporated. Hareendran got a proposal from Indu, the daughter of a rich businessman. GK and his girlfriend Pooja helps Hareendran in meeting Indu and discussing things since Hareendran was a shy guy. Alex, who is an idealist, is in love with Indu. But they have silly quarrels, and many times, their respective egos do not permit them.

Cast
Indrajith as Hareendra Varma / Hareendran
Jayasurya as Gopalakrishnan / GK
Manikuttan as Alex 
Bhama as Indu
Sherin as  Pooja Vasudevan
Jagathy Sreekumar as "Gulf" Vasudevan 
Salim Kumar as  Rajendran Vazhayila
Cochin Haneefa
Majeed as Indu's father 
Narayanankutty as Hareendran's servant 
 Tini Tom
Bala as Comm.Rajan Mathew
Ambika as Hareendran's mother
Suja Menon

Soundtrack 
The music was composed by Berny-Ignatius and the lyrics were written by Sarath Vayalar, Rajeev Alunkal 

Reception
A critic from Sify noted that "On the whole Vinayan had a very topical issue, which after his commercial packaging for entertainment purpose lost its focus and fizzled out. Better luck next time!". Paresh C. Palicha of Rediff.com'' rated the film 1.5 out of 5 stars and opined that "Vinayan may have got his heart in the right place in doing this film, but it lacks the head".

References

External links
 

2000s Malayalam-language films
2007 crime drama films
2007 films
Indian crime drama films
Films directed by Vinayan
Films scored by Berny–Ignatius